"No Regrets" is a song by British singer Robbie Williams. It was released on 30 November 1998 as the second single from his second studio album, I've Been Expecting You (1998). The track was written by Williams and Guy Chambers and features backing vocals from Neil Tennant of Pet Shop Boys and Neil Hannon of the Divine Comedy. In the United Kingdom, the song was released as a double A-side with a cover of Adam and the Ants' "Antmusic".

"No Regrets" / "Antmusic" became another top-five hit for Williams in the United Kingdom. "Antmusic" was also featured on the UK trailer to the Pixar animated film A Bug's Life (1998). One of the B-sides, "Sexed Up", was later re-recorded for the Escapology album and released as a single in 2003.

Release and reception
Following the song's release on 30 November 1998, it reached number four on the UK Singles Chart and went on to sell over 200,000 copies, being certified silver by the British Phonographic Industry (BPI).

Music video
The video has Robbie Williams at first performing in a Vegas-like show. He then realises he cannot fake being happy and leaves the stage. He walks to a petrol station (which is in Hurley opposite the former East Arms Pub), gets some petrol in a jerry can, and begins walking through crowds and over roads, dribbling petrol in a line the whole way. Finally, a spark is dropped at the petrol station and lights up the whole trail as Williams narrates the last lines.

Track listings

UK CD1
 "No Regrets" – 5:10
 "Antmusic" – 3:31
 "Deceiving Is Believing" – 4:30

UK CD2
 "No Regrets" – 5:10
 "There She Goes" (live at the Forum) – 2:51
 "Sexed Up" (demo version) – 3:54
 "There She Goes" (live at the Forum – enhanced video) – 2:51

UK 7-inch single and European CD single
 "No Regrets" – 5:10
 "Antmusic" – 3:31

European maxi-CD single
 "No Regrets" – 5:10
 "Antmusic" – 3:31
 "Sexed Up" (demo version) – 3:54
 "There She Goes" (live at the Forum) – 2:51
 "There She Goes" (live at the Forum – enhanced video) – 2:58

French CD single
 "No Regrets" (radio edit) – 4:00
 "No Regrets" (album version) – 5:10
 "Antmusic" – 3:31

Credits and personnel
Credits are lifted from the I've Been Expecting You album booklet.

Studio
 Mastered at Metropolis Mastering (London, England)

Personnel

 Robbie Williams – writing, vocals
 Guy Chambers – writing, keyboards, piano, orchestral samples, bass synth, production, arrangement
 "Planet" Claire Worrall – backing vocals
 Neil Tennant – backing vocals
 Neil Hannon – backing vocals
 David Catlin-Birch – acoustic guitar
 Gary Nuttall – electric guitar
 Fil Eisler – bass guitar
 Chris Sharrock – drums
 Andy Duncan – percussion
 Steve Power – production, recording, mixing, programming
 Steve McNichol – programming
 Tony Cousins – mastering

Charts

Certifications

References

Robbie Williams songs
1998 singles
1998 songs
Chrysalis Records singles
Song recordings produced by Guy Chambers
Song recordings produced by Steve Power
Songs written by Guy Chambers
Songs written by Robbie Williams